The 90th Assembly District of Wisconsin is one of 99 districts in the Wisconsin State Assembly.  Located in northeastern Wisconsin, the district covers most of the city of Green Bay, Wisconsin, in central Brown County.  The district includes historic landmarks such as the Brown County Courthouse, Saint Francis Xavier Cathedral, the site of Fort Howard, and the Fort Howard Memorial Cemetery.  It also contains the Port of Green Bay and the Bay Beach Wildlife Sanctuary.  The district is represented by Democrat Kristina Shelton, since January 2021. 
 

The 90th Assembly district is located within Wisconsin's 30th Senate district, along with the 88th and 89th Assembly districts.

List of past representatives

References 

Wisconsin State Assembly districts
Brown County, Wisconsin